Mati Ahven (born 3 February 1943, in Rannu, Estonia) is an engineer and mechanic who was a member of the Estonian Supreme Soviet and a voter for the Estonian restoration of Independence.

He graduated from Põltsamaa Secondary School in 1961 and the Faculty of Mechanization of Agriculture at the Estonian University of Life Sciences in 1969.

He worked as engineer and production manager in Põltsamaa from 1969 to 1990.

In 1989, he was elected a member of the city council of Põltsamaa. From 1990 to 1992, he was a member of the Estonian Supreme Soviet, being a member of the Social Affairs Committee; He also participated in the work of the Land Use Group. On August 20, 1991, he voted for the restoration of Estonia's independence.

Awards
 2002: 5th class of the Order of the National Coat of Arms (received 23 February 2002)
 2006: 3rd class of the Order of the National Coat of Arms (received 23 February 2006)

References

1943 births
Living people
People from Elva Parish
People from Põltsamaa
Recipients of the Order of the National Coat of Arms, 3rd Class
Recipients of the Order of the National Coat of Arms, 5th Class
Estonian University of Life Sciences alumni
20th-century Estonian politicians
Voters of the Estonian restoration of Independence